Phúc Hòa may refer to several places in Vietnam, including:

 , a rural commune of Phúc Thọ District.
 Phúc Hòa, Bắc Giang, a rural commune of Tân Yên District.

See also
Phục Hòa District, a former district of Cao Bằng Province.